Water polo at the Friendship Games was contested at the Ciudad Deportiva in Havana, Cuba between 19 and 26 August 1984.

Medal summary
Six teams competed in a round-robin tournament.

The host nation, Cuba, had two teams in the tournament. However, the Cuba "B" team competed "off competition". Despite ending the tournament on the fifth place, this result was not included in the final rankings. The sixth team (i. e. Bulgaria) was instead counted as the fifth place team.

Results

Winning teams' squads

Medal table

See also
 Water polo at the 1984 Summer Olympics

Notes

References

Friendship Games
1984 in water polo
1984 in Cuban sport
Friendship Games
Friendship Games
Water polo in Cuba